The 1998 Maidstone Borough Council election took place on 7 May 1998 to elect members of Maidstone Borough Council in Kent, England. One third of the council was up for election and the council stayed under no overall control.

After the election, the composition of the council was
Liberal Democrat 21
Labour 16
Conservative 13
Independent 5

Election result
Overall turnout in the election was 27.35%.

References

1998 English local elections
1998
1990s in Kent